Hisonotus acuen is a species of armored catfish from the Xingu River in Brazil.

Etymology
The species name is taken from "acuen", the name used in anthropological literature to refer to the indigenous Xavante people.

Description
The species bears a resemblance to H. chromodontus, being distinguished by the yellow as opposed to reddish-brown color of its teeth and the transparency of the tail fin.

H. acuen grows to a maximum length of 29 millimeters.  The head is rounded, with small eyes and round lips.

General body coloration is light brown on the dorsal and yellowish on the ventral surface, the two colors being divided by a brown stripe that runs from the snout to the caudal peduncle.  The fins are transparent with brown dots on the rays.  The tail fin is transparent except for a dark spot at the base.

Males have a genital papilla, a feature missing in females.

Features can vary widely among populations, with the most variation occurring in the body's depth at the dorsal fin and in the snout and abdomen length.

Range and habitat
H. acuen is found in small streams that are part of the Xingu River basin in Matto Grosso, Brazil.  Individuals are usually found in shallow, slow flowing water.  Streams they inhabit are usually flat-bottomed and clear, with vegetation covering the streambed.

References

Otothyrinae
Fish of Brazil
Taxa named by Gabriel de Souza da Costa e Silva
Taxa named by Fabio F. Roxo
Taxa named by Claudio Oliveira (scientist)
Fish described in 2014
Endemic fauna of Brazil